Cindy Ann Vandenhole (born 1999) is a Belgian artistic gymnast.

Vandenhole started her senior career in 2015. In March, she won the all-around gold medal at the Belgian Championships. In June, she competed at the 2015 European Games and helped Belgium to a 10th-place finish in the team competition. In October, she competed at the 2015 World Artistic Gymnastics Championships and helped Belgium finish 11th.

She retired from gymnastics on 28 June 2017.

References

1999 births
Living people
Belgian female artistic gymnasts
Sportspeople from Kortrijk
Gymnasts at the 2015 European Games
European Games competitors for Belgium
Belgian women gymnasts